Parageobacillus caldoxylosilyticus is a Gram-positive, rod-shaped, thermophilic and xylanolytic bacterium from the genus of Parageobacillus.

References

Bacillaceae
Bacteria described in 2000